Abu ol Hasanabad may refer to:
 Abu ol Hasanabad, Mahmudabad